Laurel Gand is a superheroine appearing in DC Comics, primarily as a member of the Legion of Super-Heroes in the 30th and 31st centuries under the name Andromeda. She was created as a replacement for Supergirl in post-Crisis on Infinite Earths Legion continuity. She was also inspired by elements of Superman's supposed descendant Laurel Kent (who, in post-Crisis, pre-Zero Hour continuity, was revealed to be a Manhunter android).

Fictional character biography

Pre-Zero Hour

Following her death in the Crisis on Infinite Earths limited series, Supergirl was removed from mainstream DC continuity, endangering the status of every Legion story featuring the Girl of Steel. After the events of Legion of Super-Heroes (vol. 4) #4-5 (February–March 1990), the sorceress Glorith supplants the Time Trapper as reality's master of time manipulation, resulting in several alterations in Legion continuity. In the new timeline, the 30th century native Laurel Gand replaces 20th century native Supergirl in Legion history; all of Kara Zor-El's appearances are said to have been appearances by Laurel.

The pre-Zero Hour Laurel was similar to the pre-Crisis Supergirl in that she was a distant relative of the Glorithverse's Superboy analogue, Valor, and was born on an asteroid called Ricklef II (as opposed to the Krypton remnant Argo City). Also, upon arriving on Earth she had posed as a shy, bookish young woman with glasses. As a child, Laurel fought off a Khundian attack force threatening to invade Daxam (the planet of her ancestry), but not before the Khunds slaughtered her parents and other inhabitants of the Ricklef II research station. Living in exile on Earth and fearing further vengeance from the Khunds, Laurel jumped at the chance to join the Legion of Super-Heroes.

Where the pre-Crisis Supergirl had been romantically linked to Brainiac 5, so too was Laurel Gand. Laurel and Brainy eventually parted ways, and after the "Five Year Gap", it was revealed (much to Brainiac's dismay) that Laurel had married Rond Vidar and borne a daughter, Lauren. Laurel spent her years away from the Legion, singlehandedly beating Khundian forces back from the United Planets systems, and rejoined the reunited Legionnaires when her husband Rond disappeared while on a mission to rescue Mysa Nal (the White Witch) from Mordru the Merciless. Laurel proved a tremendous asset to the new Legion during the war against Earthgov and the Dominators. When the mysterious "Batch SW6" doppelgänger Legion appeared, the younger SW6 Laurel soon distinguished herself from her adult counterpart by taking on the codename "Andromeda" and wearing a colorful gold-and-black costume. It is unknown whether the adult Laurel ever used "Andromeda" (or any other codename) during her own youth in the Legion.

The adult Laurel stayed with her Legion when it was forced to go underground to fight corruption in the Science Police. Tragically, Laurel was killed by a terrorist bomb during one of the renegade Legion's early missions. Shortly thereafter, Laurel, her younger self, and the rest of the Legions were erased from history, following the Zero Hour reboot.

Post-Zero Hour

Laurel Gand spent most of her early life in a xenophobic Daxamite White Triangle community, being indoctrinated in the "horrors" of interspecies co-operation before the Triangle's political clout led her to become the Daxamite representative in the Legion. Away from Daxam's red sun, she gained powers similar to Superman's, but the race-wide hypersensitivity of Daxamites to lead meant that even minuscule amounts could prove fatal, even to a powered-up Daxamite, forcing her to wear a transuit at all times. This did not trouble her, since it meant she never had to actually touch any non-Daxamites.

Her Triangle-derived beliefs hampered her effectiveness as a Legionnaire, thanks to her reluctance to physically engage with any enemies, but the real problems started after she let several Triangle members go free after a mugging, shortly after which they beat and almost killed Triad. Angered more for their defiance of her than for the beating, when she was ordered away to prevent the Composite Man gaining her powers, she flew after them. Immediately, they tore her transuit and directly exposed her to lead, and she barely managed to turn them over to the Science Police before crashing through the walls of Legion HQ.

While Brainiac 5 worked on devising an anti-lead serum, he confronted her about her beliefs. After discovering the serum which Vril Dox II, his direct ancestor, had created for Valor and tailoring it to her genetic structure to allow it to work properly on her (much to her surprise, as she had been taught that all members of the same race were identical), Brainiac 5 forced her to confront the fact that he wasn't her inferior before giving her the serum. While this was happening, however, Shrinking Violet discovered a White Triangle necklace in her room and connected it to the group which had assaulted Triad and destroyed Trom, telling the rest of the team.

Confined to quarters after an unsuccessful attempt by Cosmic Boy to have her removed from the team, she used her super-senses to see Ambassador Roxxas gloating, but he managed to bully her into giving him the anti-lead serum. Taking it himself and giving it to four other Daxamites, they proceeded to cause mass destruction on Earth. When Andromeda herself confronted Roxxas over what he was doing and had made her do, she was almost defeated when Violet began thrashing around in his head, before coming out and telling Andromeda to take him down. As she pummelled him repeatedly, he destroyed the covering of an "atomic furnace", and both were thought to have died in the resulting inferno (causing Brainiac 5 severe depression). Only Cosmic Boy was told that she had survived and voluntarily exiled herself to Planet Hell.

Later, she was brought out of this exile by Live Wire, after Cosmic Boy had told him where she was as part of a way to build up a "Legion Rescue Squad", and she was awed by Valor (who later called himself M'onel), himself being another member. She he declined to rejoin the Legion after the Squad had served its purpose, preferring to head off into deep space. She eventually joined a religious convent.

After the events of Infinite Crisis, Earth-247, the home of the Post-Zero Hour Legion, was destroyed. Andromeda appears in Final Crisis: Legion of 3 Worlds, battling Superboy-Prime along with M'onel (Valor) and Superman. Later, in the fifth issue, her pre-Zero Hour younger and older counterparts are called to battle the Time Trapper, alongside dozens of other Legionnaires from alternate realities. She survives the battle and leaves with the 247 Legion to try to rescue more survivors from destroyed universes.

Powers and abilities
Generally, the abilities of Laurel Gand (and other Daxamites) are identical to those of Superman and other natives of the planet Krypton (super-strength; speed; flight; X-ray, heat, microscopic or telescopic vision powers; invulnerability and super hearing), with three major exceptions:

1. She is vulnerable to the inert element lead instead of the radioactive element Kryptonite. Lead poisoning is fatal to Daxamites, and Laurel is kept alive only through ingestion of anti-lead serum, such as the one modified by Brainiac 5.

3. In her two pre-"Zero Hour" incarnations, red star radiation would not rob Laurel of her powers, as it would with most Daxamites and Kryptonians.

In other media
 Andromeda makes a cameo appearance in the Superman: The Animated Series episode "New Kids In Town".
 Andromeda appears in Justice League Adventures #28.

See also
Alternative versions of Supergirl

External links
A Hero History Of Andromeda/Laurel Kent

References

Comics characters introduced in 1990
Characters created by Keith Giffen
DC Comics characters who can move at superhuman speeds
DC Comics characters with superhuman senses
DC Comics characters with superhuman strength
DC Comics extraterrestrial superheroes
DC Comics female superheroes
Fictional characters with slowed ageing
Fictional characters with X-ray vision
Fictional characters with nuclear or radiation abilities
Fictional characters with air or wind abilities
Fictional characters with ice or cold abilities
Fictional characters with absorption or parasitic abilities
Fictional characters with energy-manipulation abilities
Fictional characters with fire or heat abilities